Pablo Acha González (born 4 August 1996) is a Spanish male recurve archer.

Acha won an individual gold medal and a mixed team silver medal at the 2021 European Championships. He has also medalled at the 2018 Mediterranean Games, the 2019 European Games and several Archery World Cups.

Career
In 2017, Acha debuted on the senior international circuit. He won a surprise bronze medal in the mixed team event in the second leg of the 2017 Archery World Cup in Antalya, defeating the American team in the third-place match while partnering with Alicia Marín. He also competed in his first World Championships a few months later.

Acha won two bronze medals at the 2018 Mediterranean Games in Tarragona, one as an individual and one as a team. He followed this with another individual bronze at the 2019 European Games in Minsk, which secured Spain's qualification to the 2020 Summer Olympics. Due to the COVID-19 pandemic, the only notable event Acha competed at in 2020 was the Indoor World Cup in France, where he placed fifth in the individual event.

In 2021, Acha won two team medals in the Archery World Cup: a gold in the first leg and a silver in the second. He teamed with Miguel Alvariño and Daniel Castro, beating the United States in the final to win their country's first gold medal in history of the event. That summer he competed at the 2021 European Championships. He won a gold medal in the individual event, defeating Galsan Bazarzhapov in the final. He also took home a silver medal partnering with Elia Canales in the mixed team event, ultimately losing to the Russian duo of Aldar Tsybikzhapov and Elena Osipova.

He won the silver medal in the men's team recurve event at the 2022 European Archery Championships held in Munich, Germany.

Personal life
Originally from Burgos, Acha moved to Madrid for his training. He got his start in archery at the age of eight because his older brother was doing it and his uncle was president of a local archery club.

Acha is currently studying robotics and automation at the University of Burgos.

References

External links
 Pablo Acha at the-sports.org

Living people
1996 births
Spanish male archers
Competitors at the 2018 Mediterranean Games
Competitors at the 2022 Mediterranean Games
Mediterranean Games medalists in archery
Mediterranean Games silver medalists for Spain
Mediterranean Games bronze medalists for Spain
Archers at the 2019 European Games
European Games medalists in archery
European Games bronze medalists for Spain
Sportspeople from Burgos
21st-century Spanish people